The women's 400 metre freestyle event at the 1960 Olympic Games took place between August 31 and September 1. This swimming event used freestyle swimming, which means that the method of the stroke is not regulated (unlike backstroke, breaststroke, and butterfly events). Nearly all swimmers use the front crawl or a variant of that stroke. Because an Olympic size swimming pool is 50 metres long, this race consisted of eight lengths of the pool.

Medalists

Results

Heats
Heat 1

Heat 2

Heat 3

Final

Key: OR = Olympic record

References

Women's freestyle 400 metre
1960 in women's swimming
Women's events at the 1960 Summer Olympics